Abdul Karim (born May 10, 1967) is an Indonesian sprint canoer who competed in the early 1990s. At the 1992 Summer Olympics in Barcelona, he was eliminated in the repechages of both the K-2 500 m and the K-2 1000 m events.

External links
Sports-Reference.com profile

1967 births
Canoeists at the 1992 Summer Olympics
Indonesian male canoeists
Living people
Olympic canoeists of Indonesia
Canoeists at the 1994 Asian Games
Asian Games competitors for Indonesia
20th-century Indonesian people
21st-century Indonesian people